Oppe or Oppé may refer to the following people
Given name
Oppe Pinto (born 1963), Paraguayan boxer

Surname
Paul Oppé (1878–1957), English art historian, critic, and museum official
Tom Oppé (1925–2007), English paediatrician, nephew of Paul

See also
Oppes